Weapons of Mass Distraction is a 1997 television film directed by Stephen Surjik and written by Larry Gelbart, about two media moguls and their fight over ownership of a professional American football team. The film starred Gabriel Byrne and Ben Kingsley, with an ensemble supporting cast including Illeana Douglas, Mimi Rogers, and Jeffrey Tambor.

The film was nominated for four awards at the 49th Primetime Emmy Awards, including Outstanding Writing for a Miniseries or a Special for Gelbart.

Plot
Lionel Powers and Julian Messenger are filthy rich men with dirty family secrets. They play dirty as well, fighting for control over a professional football team in Los Angeles with every weapon at their disposal.

While the billionaires scheme and squabble, the married couple Rita and Jerry Pascoe can barely make ends meet. Their marriage becomes strained with Jerry's continuing inability to hold or find a job. While rich people blackmail one another, homeless people look for handouts and Jerry Pascoe is reduced to cleaning stadium restrooms and applying for a job as a peanut vendor.

The tabloid-worthy secrets in the lives of Powers' wife Ariel and right-hand man Alan Blanchard lead to dire consequences for all. The marriage of the Pascoes, meanwhile, turns tragi-comically from a terrible climax to fodder for reality TV.

Cast
 Gabriel Byrne as Lionel Powers
 Ben Kingsley as Julian Messenger
 Mimi Rogers as Ariel Powers
 Jeffrey Tambor as Alan Blanchard
 Illeana Douglas as Rita Pascoe
 Paul Mazursky as 	Dr. Jonathon Cummings
 Chris Mulkey as Jerry Pascoe
 R. Lee Ermey as Billy Paxton
 Caroline Aaron as Robin Zimmer
 Jason Lee as Philip Messenger

External links

1997 films
1997 television films
1997 drama films
American business films
American football films
1990s English-language films
Films scored by Don Davis (composer)
Films about businesspeople
Films about competitions
Films directed by Stephen Surjik
HBO Films films
Films with screenplays by Larry Gelbart
1990s business films
1990s American films